Bonnie Garcia (born August 13, 1962) is a California politician. She was the representative for California's 80th State Assembly district, serving eastern Riverside County and all of Imperial County, from 2002 through 2008. In 2014 she was a candidate for the California State Senate to represent the 28th district, centered in Riverside County but lost the Republican primary to Jeff Stone. She is a Republican and lives in Palm Desert, California.

Assemblywoman Garcia was elected to the post in 2002, being the first Hispanic woman to represent the district and the first Puerto Rican elected to statewide office in California. By 2004, Garcia had become a member of Governor Arnold Schwarzenegger's transition team after the recall election against Gray Davis and was named as one of California's delegates to the Republican National Convention.

Garcia was one of five children born in Manhattan's Lower East Side to a young Puerto Rican couple who divorced soon after her birth. At age thirty-eight, after years of night classes, Garcia earned a Bachelor of Science degree in workforce development from Southern Illinois University.

Schwarzenegger made an off-the-cuff comment on September 7, 2006 describing her as having a "hot Latina temperament", which brought him some criticism. But Garcia, a fellow Republican, stated that she was "not offended by the Governor's comments."

She was ineligible to seek reelection to the State Assembly in 2008 due to term limits. On December 31, 2008, Schwarzenegger appointed Garcia to the state's Unemployment Insurance Appeals Board. She also runs her own public affairs firm.  In 2014, she ran for the California State Senate, but lost a close election to Riverside County Supervisor Jeff Stone, a fellow Republican.

References

External links
Join California Bonnie Garcia

Republican Party members of the California State Assembly
Women state legislators in California
American politicians of Puerto Rican descent
Southern Illinois University alumni
Politicians from New York City
People from Cathedral City, California
Living people
Hispanic and Latino American women in politics
21st-century American politicians
21st-century American women politicians
People from the Lower East Side
Hispanic and Latino American state legislators in California
1962 births